| tries = {{#expr:

 + 2  + 7  + 9  + 5 + 6 + 5  + 5  + 4 + 2  + 4
 + 7  + 6  + 5  + 9 + 6 + 7  + 11 + 3 + 1  + 4
 + 2  + 11 + 11 + 8 + 7 + 3  + 2  + 5 + 9  + 5
 + 10 + 3  + 2  + 6 + 9 + 3  + 5  + 2 + 6  + 5
 + 4  + 9  + 7  + 0 + 7 + 11 + 6  + 5 + 6  + 5
 + 3  + 5  + 3  + 9 + 7 + 5  + 3  + 6 + 11 + 5
 + 4 + 3 + 4 + 4
 + 6 + 6
 + 0
}}
| top point scorer = Owen Farrell (Saracens)(92 points)
| top try scorer = Dan Evans (Ospreys)(6 tries)
| venue = San Mamés Stadium, Bilbao
| attendance2 = 52,282
| champions = Leinster 
| count =4
| runner-up = Racing 92
| website = http://www.epcrugby.com
| previous year = 2016–17
| previous tournament = 2016–17 European Rugby Champions Cup
| next year = 2018–19
| next tournament = 2018–19 European Rugby Champions Cup
}}

The 2017–18 European Rugby Champions Cup was the fourth European Rugby Champions Cup championship (23rd overall), the annual rugby union club competition for teams from the top six nations in European rugby and was the twenty-third season of pan-European professional club rugby competition.

The format of the competition began with a play-off qualification round at the end of the preceding season featuring teams from England, France, Ireland and Wales. The winner joined 19 teams already qualified by way of their domestic league position in the pool stage of the competition -  a home and away round-robin for five groups of four teams. Following the pool stage, five pool winners, and three highest ranked runners-up, qualified for the quarter-finals of the competition, as the Cup thereafter reverted to a single elimination knockout format.

The tournament began on 13 October 2017. The final was won by Leinster on 12 May 2018 at San Mamés Stadium in Bilbao, Spain.	 This was Leinster's fourth title, tying the record for the most successful team in the competition's history. This was the first time the final was held outside one of the Six Nations countries.

Teams
Twenty clubs from the three major European domestic and regional leagues competed in the Champions Cup. Nineteen of these qualified directly as a result of their league performance.

The distribution of teams was:
 England: 7 clubs
 The top 6 clubs in the English Premiership. (6 clubs)
 The winner of the Champions Cup play-off, Northampton Saints. (1 club)
 France: 6 clubs
 The top 6 clubs in the Top 14. (6 clubs)
 Ireland, Italy, Scotland & Wales: 7 clubs, based on performance in the Pro12.
 The best placed club from each nation. (4 clubs)
 The 3 highest ranked clubs not qualified thereafter. (3 clubs)

The following teams qualified for the 2017–18 tournament.

20th team play-off

The play-off system that had been suspended the season before, due to the 2015 Rugby World Cup, returned to decide the final team competing in the Champions Cup.

Four clubs competed in a play-off to decide the final team in the Champions Cup.

The play-off comprised 3 matches, contested by one team from the Aviva Premiership, one from the Top 14, and two from the Guinness Pro12.

The two Pro12 teams played either the Premiership or Top 14 side in a single-leg semi-final, held at the home ground of the non-Pro12 side. The winners of these matches then played in a play-off final, and the winner of this match took the 20th place in the Champions Cup. The three losing teams will all compete in the 2017–18 European Rugby Challenge Cup.

The following teams took part:

Matches
A draw was held on 15 March 2017 to determine the two semi-final matches, and the semi-final winner that would have home advantage in the final.

Semi-finals

Play-off final

Team details
Below is the list of coaches, captain and stadiums with their method of qualification for each team.

Note: Placing shown in brackets, denotes standing at the end of the regular season for their respective leagues, with their end of season positioning shown through CH for Champions, RU for Runner-up, SF for losing Semi-finalist and QF for losing Quarter-finalist.

Seeding
The twenty competing teams are seeded and split into four tiers, each containing five teams.

For the purpose of creating the tiers, clubs are ranked based on their domestic league performances and on their qualification for the knockout phases of their championships, so a losing quarter-finalist in the Top 14 would be seeded below a losing semi-finalist, even if they finished above them in the regular season.

Based on these seedings, teams are placed into one of the four tiers, with the top seed clubs being put in Tier 1. The nature of the tier system means that a draw is needed to allocate two of the three second seed clubs to Tier 1 and to allocate one of the three fourth seed clubs to Tier 2. The tiers are shown below. Brackets show each team's seeding and their league (for example, 1 Top 14 indicates the team was seeded 1st from the Top 14).

The following restrictions will apply to the draw:
 Each pool will consist of four clubs, one from each Tier in the draw.
 Each pool must have one from each league drawn from Tier 1, 2 or 3. No pool will have a second team from the same league until the allocation of Tier 4 takes place.
 Where two Pro12 clubs compete in the same pool, they must be from different countries.

Pool stage

The draw took place on 8 June 2017, in Neuchâtel, Switzerland.	

Teams in the same pool play each other twice, at home and away, in the group stage that begins on the weekend of 13/14/15 October 2017, and continues through to 19/20/21 January 2018. The five pool winners and three best runners-up progress to the quarter finals.

Teams are awarded group points based on match performances. Four points are awarded for a win, two points for a draw, one attacking bonus point for scoring four or more tries in a match and one defensive bonus point for losing a match by seven points or fewer.

In the event of a tie between two or more teams, the following tie-breakers will be used, as directed by EPCR:
 Where teams have played each other
 The club with the greater number of competition points from only matches involving tied teams.
 If equal, the club with the best aggregate points difference from those matches.
 If equal, the club that scored the most tries in those matches.
 Where teams remain tied and/or have not played each other in the competition (i.e. are from different pools)
 The club with the best aggregate points difference from the pool stage.
 If equal, the club that scored the most tries in the pool stage.
 If equal, the club with the fewest players suspended in the pool stage.
 If equal, the drawing of lots will determine a club's ranking.

Pool 1

Pool 2

Pool 3

Pool 4

Pool 5

Ranking of pool leaders and runners-up

Knock-out stage

Format
The eight qualifiers were ranked according to their performance in the pool stage and competed in the quarter-finals which were held on the weekend of 30/31 March, 1 April 2018. The four top teams were at home in the quarter-finals against the four lower teams in a 1v8, 2v7, 3v6 and 4v5 format.

The semi-finals were played on the weekend of 20/21/22 April 2018. In lieu of the draw that used to determine the semi-final pairing, EPCR announced that a fixed semi-final bracket would be set in advance, and that the home team would be designated based on "performances by clubs during the pool stages as well as the achievement of a winning a quarter-final match away from home". Semi-final matches must be played at a neutral ground in the designated home team's country.

Home country advantage was awarded as follows:

Bracket

Quarter-finals

Semi-finals

Final

Attendances

Does not include the attendance at the final as it takes place at a neutral venue.

See also
 2017–18 European Rugby Challenge Cup
 2017–18 European Rugby Continental Shield

Notes

References

 
Champions Cup
European Rugby Champions Cup
European Rugby Champions Cup
European Rugby Champions Cup
European Rugby Champions Cup
European Rugby Champions Cup
European Rugby Champions Cup
European Rugby Champions Cup
European Rugby Champions Cup seasons